The Lichen Case-bearer (Dahlica lichenella) is a moth of the Psychidae family. It is found in Europe and has also been recorded in North America.

The wingspan is 13–16 mm for males. They have dark wings with lighter grey spots. Females are wingless. Adults are on wing from March to April or the beginning of May in western Europe.

The larvae feed on lichen, algae and plant remains from within a case. The case is covered in granules of sand, lichen and/or algae. Larvae can be found from June to March and overwinter. Pupation takes place within the case in March or April.

References

Moths described in 1761
Psychidae
Moths of Europe
Taxa named by Carl Linnaeus